Chita is a town and municipality in the Colombian Department of Boyacá, part of the Valderrama Province a subregion of Boyaca in Colombia.

Municipalities of Boyacá Department